Santosh Sahu (born 15 March 1974) is an Indian cricketer. He played in 22 first-class and 31 List A matches for Madhya Pradesh and Railways from 1998 to 2006.

See also
 List of Madhya Pradesh cricketers

References

External links
 

1974 births
Living people
Indian cricketers
Madhya Pradesh cricketers
Railways cricketers
People from Bilaspur, Chhattisgarh